The 2017 Ellison Creek flooding or mostly known as the 2017 Payson flash floods occurred on July 15, 2017, near Payson, Arizona, in the Water Wheel Falls Hiking Trail in the Tonto National Forest that killed 10 members of an extended family. Before the flash floods, 10 of those people, and 4 others, were celebrating a birthday party.

Start of the flood event 
On the day of July 15, 2017, an extended family of 14 were celebrating a birthday party at the Cold Springs Swimming Hole in the Water Wheel Falls Hiking Trail. The weather was cloudy and calm with some heavy rains throughout the day with temperatures reaching . Besides the family of 14, many other people were also at Water Wheel Falls Hiking Trail to relax and swim in cold waters in the area. Hours earlier, heavy rains hit the area as part of the North American Monsoon, which hits the Southwestern U.S. every year between June and mid-September. At around 3 p.m. (MST), many of the people, including children, were swimming in the waters of the canyon when all of a sudden they hear a loud prolonged sound. When the people looked upstream, they saw a large wall of black muddy water rushing towards them. The water was carrying rocks and large logs the size of cars. The flood waters were approximately 6-foot tall and 40-feet wide. The flood swept away many of the swimmers while many other people were holding onto trees waiting to be rescued. The floods eventually moved into the East Verde River.

The search for survivors and fatalities 
While the waters of the flood were damaging everything in its path, 9-1-1 dispatchers were called and helicopters were needed to be used to rescue the people struggling to stay alive. Many any of the people were later rescued. After the flood event, searches for the missing were conducted. Many family members of the missing arrived on scene and were worried that their relatives didn't make it. In the following days, an announcement was made that search crews did unfortunately find 9 bodies and 1 was still missing. The missing person named Hector Garnica was found days later deceased.

Aftermath 
As a result, the flood event left 10 people dead (half of them children) and 4 people were injured. A funeral was held for the people who died in the flood. The cost of damages is unknown. Years later, family members of the victims had filed a lawsuit against the U.S. Government for wrongful death, negligence, and negligent infliction of emotional distress.

Causes 
There were mainly two causes of the flash flood. A month earlier before the tragedy occurred, the Highline Fire, a raging wildfire that burned 7,000+ acres of land near Ellison Creek, which explains the mixture of ash and logs that were in the flood waters on the day of the disaster. Another cause that might have been the main culprit for the tragedy was that even though there was a flash flood warning issued for the area, in the people's remote spot they did not get the warning.

Gallery

See Also 
 List of natural disasters in the United States

References

External links 
 "Remains Believed to Be Missing Arizona Flash Flood Victim, Officials Say", article by the Weather Channel (Eric Chaney & Pam Wright)

Floods in the United States
July 2017 events in the United States
2017 floods in the United States
2017 in Arizona
Natural disasters in Arizona